The 1956 NAIA football season was the first season of college football sponsored by the National Association of Intercollegiate Athletics.

The season was played from August to December 1956, culminating in the inaugural NAIA Football National Championship, played at War Memorial Stadium in Little Rock, Arkansas. Saint Joseph's (IN) and Montana State played to a 0–0 tie in the championship game known as the 1956 Aluminum Bowl.

Conference standings

Postseason

1956 Aluminum Bowl

See also
 1956 NCAA University Division football season
 1956 NCAA College Division football season

References

 
NAIA Football National Championship